Sworn Vengeance is the fourth studio album released by death metal band Severe Torture in 2007. It was recorded at Excess Studios in The Netherlands with producers Hans Pieters and Robbe Kok.

Track listing 
Dismal Perception (Marvin Vriesde, Seth Van De Loo) – 02:51
Serenity Torn Asunder (Vriesde) – 03:28
Fight Something (Vriesde, Patrick "Pat" Boleij) – 04:15
Repeat Offender (Vriesde) – 03:21
Countless Villains – 03:56 (Vreisde)
Dogmasomatic Nausea (Van De Loo, Boleij) – 02:50
Redefined Identity (Vriesde, Van De Loo) – 03:29
Buried Hatchet (Vriesde, Boliej) – 03:41
Sworn Vengeance (Vriesde, Boliej, Van De Loo) – 05:19
Submerged in Grief (Vriesde) [Instrumental] – 02:52

American edition bonus tracks
 "It's The Limit" (originally by Cro-Mags) – 1:50
"Eyemaster" (originally by Entombed) – 3:04

Personnel
Dennis Schreurs – vocals 
Thijs van Laarhoven – rhythm guitar 
Patrick Boleij – bass 
Seth van de Loo – drums 
Marvin Vriesde – lead guitar 
Ché Snelting (Born From Pain) – guest Vocals on "Buried Hatchet" & "It's The Limit"
Jason Netherton (Misery Index) – guest Vocals on "Buried Hatchet"

Severe Torture albums
2007 albums
Earache Records albums